D'Andre Goodwin is a former professional American football wide receiver and an assistant college football coach. He played in one game for the Denver Broncos of the National Football League (NFL) in the 2011-12 playoffs.

Playing career
Goodwin played football at Antelope Valley High School and at the University of Washington.
On January 14, 2012, Goodwin played in the 2011–12 NFL playoffs for the Denver Broncos in their divisional round game against the New England Patriots. The Broncos lost the game 45–10, and were thus eliminated from the playoffs. This was Goodwin's only NFL playoff appearance and he never saw action during an NFL regular season game.

Coaching career
Goodwin is currently the wide receivers coach for the football program at the College of Idaho.

See also 
 2011 Denver Broncos season

References

1987 births
Living people
American football wide receivers
Washington Huskies football players
Denver Broncos players
Antelope Valley High School alumni
People from Lancaster, California